Donjuan is a Colombian monthly lads mag and known for its pictorials featuring popular actresses, singers, and female models, sometimes pictured dressed, often pictured scantily dressed but not fully nude.

See also
 SoHo (magazine)

External links
 Official website

2006 establishments in Colombia
Men's magazines published in Colombia
Magazines established in 2006
Mass media in Bogotá
Monthly magazines
Spanish-language magazines